The 2019–20 season was the 71st season in Dinamo București's history, all of them played in the top-flight of Romanian football. Dinamo competed in Liga I and in the Cupa României.

Facts and events
On 3 June 2019, head coach Mircea Rednic was sacked due to poor results. On the same day, the club announced the new coach, Eugen Neagoe.

Also before the start of the season, Florin Prunea was named general manager of the club.

During the match against Universitatea Craiova, head coach Eugen Neagoe suffered a heart attack. He was rushed to the ambulance and resuscitated, then he was taken to Floreasca Hospital where he was stabilised.

Neagoe was advised by doctors to take a break in the coming period and the assistant coach Sebastian Moga led the team against CFR Cluj. Then, for the matches against Academica Clinceni and Poli Iași, Moga was assisted by Iulian Mihăescu.

On 12 August, Dinamo announced the separation from Neagoe. The next day, the Czech manager Dušan Uhrin Jr. was installed as head coach. Seven months later, Dinamo and Uhrin reached an agreement to end mutually the contract. In 23 games in Liga I with Uhrin in charge, Dinamo won nine and lost ten.

On 11 March, Adrian Mihalcea was appointed as the new head coach of Dinamo.

Dinamo's return after a three-month suspension due to coronavirus was postponed. The first two games that Dinamo should have played at the restart were rescheduled when Dinamo's kitman tested positive for the coronavirus and the entire team was quarantined.

Mihalcea began his tenure with four losses in the first four games in charge and Dinamo reached bottom in the championship. On 5 July, Dinamo won against Academica Clinceni and hauled themselves off the bottom position but stayed in the relegation zone. The next game ended in a draw, at home, against Politehnica Iași. Thus, Mihalcea was sacked, after only seven games in charge. Gheorghe Mulțescu came back as Dinamo's head coach, for the fourth time.

Dinamo was again affected by coronavirus. Six players tested positive on 16 July and the entire team was again quarantined for five days, until the next set of tests. Other four players tested positive the next two days. On 22 July, the number of infected players rose to 18.

On 6 August, the Liga I season was frozen and Dinamo didn't play all its postponed games, finishing the season on the 13th place. But Dinamo was spared from relegation after the Romanian Federation decided to increase the number of teams in Liga I from 14 to 16. Thus, only the 14th place played a relegation/promotion play-off against the third place in Liga II.

Previous season positions

Transfers

In

Loans in

Out

Loans out

Friendlies

Competitions

Overview

Liga I

The Liga I fixture list was announced in July 2019.

Regular season

Table

Results summary

Results by round

Matches

Relegation round

Table

Results summary

Results by round

Matches

Cupa României

Dinamo București entered the Cupa României at the Round of 32.

Statistics

Appearances and goals

! colspan="13" style="background:#DCDCDC; text-align:center" | Players transferred out or loaned out during the season
|-

|}

Squad statistics
{|class="wikitable" style="text-align: center;"
|-
! 
! style="width:70px;"|Liga I
! style="width:70px;"|Cupa României
! style="width:70px;"|Home
! style="width:70px;"|Away
! style="width:70px;"|Total Stats
|-
|align=left|Games played       || 35 || 5 || 19 || 21 || 40
|-
|align=left|Games won          || 12 || 3 || 9 || 6 || 15
|-
|align=left|Games drawn        || 6 || 0 || 4 || 2 || 6
|-
|align=left|Games lost         || 17 || 2 || 6 || 13 || 19
|-
|align=left|Goals scored       || 45 || 8 || 28 || 25 || 53
|-
|align=left|Goals conceded     || 52 || 5 || 22 || 35 || 57
|-
|align=left|Goal difference    || -7 || 3 || 6 || -10 || -4
|-
|align=left|Clean sheets       || 6 || 2 || 5 || 3 || 8
|-
|align=left|Yellow cards       || 105 || 16 || 50 || 67 || 121
|-
|align=left|Red cards          || 4 || 0 || 3 || 1 || 4
|-
|align=left| Winning rate      || 34.2% || 60% || 47.3% || 28.5% || 37.5% 
|-

Goalscorers

Goal minutes

Last updated: 5 August 2020 (UTC) 
Source: Soccerway

Hat-tricks

Clean sheets

Disciplinary record

Attendances

See also

 2019–20 Cupa României
 2019–20 Liga I

Notes

References

FC Dinamo București seasons
Dinamo, București, FC